Calolampra elegans is a species of cockroach in the family Blaberidae. It is found in Queensland, Australia.

References

 Diet and carbohydrase activities in three cockroaches, Calolampra elegans roth and princis, Geoscapheus dilatatus saussure and Panesthia cribrata saussure. J Zhang, A.M Scrivener, M Slaytor and H.A Rose, Comparative Biochemistry and Physiology Part A: Physiology, Volume 104, Issue 1, January 1993, Pages 155-161, 
 Paranauphoeta rufipes Brunner in Queensland, and a Description of the Female Calolampra elegans Roth and Princis (Dictyoptera : Blattaria : Blaberidae). Louis M Roth, Memoirs of The Queensland Museum, 1989, volume 27, pages 589-597 (article)

Cockroaches
Insects described in 1973
Insects of Queensland
Endemic fauna of Australia